Friends (with benefits) is a 2009 romantic comedy film released on June 12, 2009 at the Seattle True Independent Film Festival.

Production

Casting
The film stars Margaret Laney as Chloe and Alex Brown as Owen, lifelong best friends and current med school students. Rounding out their tight-knit group of friends are Anne Peterson as Allison, Jake Alexander as Jeff, Lynn Mancinelli as Shirley, Brendan Bradley as Brad and Rooney Mara as Tara.

Development
Taken off a script originally written by Gorman Bechard in 1999, the film was shopped around that summer under the title Fuck Buddies to every major studio in Hollywood. Inevitably, the script was put on the back burner until Bechard started looking for a lighter follow-up to his extremely dark 2005 feature You Are Alone.  In 2006 Bechard teamed with writing partner Ashley McGarry and they began to rewrite the film, changing the title to Friends (with benefits) and casting Margaret Laney in the lead role.

Filming
Production began in April 2007. The film was shot over 18 days in New Haven, Connecticut.

Release
The film debuted at the Seattle True Independent Film Festival on June 12, 2009 and received their award for "Best Romantic Comedy".  The film was released on DVD in the United States in August 2010.

References

External links
 
 

American coming-of-age films
American independent films
American sex comedy films
2009 films
2009 romantic comedy films
Films directed by Gorman Bechard
2000s sex comedy films
2009 independent films
2000s English-language films
2000s American films